The Buick Velite 7 is a subcompact electric crossover. It is sold exclusively in China.  The Velite 7 is similar to the Chevrolet Bolt, using the same BEV2 platform, but is slightly larger.

History

A car resembling the Buick Velite 7 first appeared in a document from 2017 describing GM's future electric vehicle plans. However, the image was quickly replaced with a covered vehicle. In January 2020, the Velite 7 was photographed while being road tested under camouflage. At the time, it was speculated this was an upcoming variant of the Chevrolet Bolt which would be released as the Bolt EUV. It was later confirmed the vehicle was the Velite 7, although the Bolt EUV is a closely-related rebadged Velite with some styling differences. Undisguised photographs of the Velite 7 were released that month under a filing with the Ministry of Industry and Information Technology.

GM announced the Velite 7 in June 2020, highlighting the estimated range of  under the NEDC testing protocol. The Velite 7 was launched in July 2020, alongside a new PHEV version of the Buick Velite 6 wagon.

Design
The Buick Velite 7 is available in two variants. It features two driving modes (standard and sport), and two modes of energy recycling: Regen on Demand, and One Pedal Driving. Standard advanced driver-assistance systems include autonomous emergency braking and omniview technology.

Estimated acceleration is 0– in 8.6 seconds.

See also 
Buick Velite 6
New energy vehicles in China
Plug-in electric vehicle

References

External links

 

Velite 7
Production electric cars
Cars introduced in 2020
2020s cars
Crossover sport utility vehicles
Mini sport utility vehicles
Cars of China